The Black Sea Lowland is a major geographic feature of the Northern Pontic region and the East European Plain. It is almost completely within Southern Ukraine covering half of its territory.

Location
The lowland is located along the northern shores of Black Sea, stretching from west to east from the Danubian Plain, contiguous with the Wallachian Plain and forming the Lower Danubian Plain, and Bugeac. Past Molochna River to the east, it transforms into a narrow Azov Littoral, Azov Lowland. To the south-east the Black Sea Lowland extends onto the Crimean peninsula where it is known as Crimean Lowland. The northern borders composed out of several uplands such as Moldavian Plateau, Podillia Upland, Dnieper Upland, Zaporizhian Ridge, Azov Upland. Azov, Crimean, and Bugeac lowlands consider to be extension of the Black Sea Lowland and its regional extremities.

Description
Black Sea Lowland is an accumulative, weakly divided plain which being part of the greater Eastern European Plain gradually slopes towards the Black Sea and the Sea of Azov.

External links
 Black Sea Lowland at Encyclopedia of Ukraine.
 Black Sea Lowland at Ukrainian Soviet Encyclopedia

References

Plains of Ukraine
East European Plain